The Sohgaura copper plate inscription is an Indian copper plate inscription written in Prakrit in the Brahmi script. It was discovered in Sohgaura, a village on the banks of the Rapti River, about 20 km south-east of Gorakhpur, in the Gorakhpur District, Uttar Pradesh, India.

The plate, consisting of a line of symbolic drawings and four lines of text, is the result of a molding. The inscription is sometimes presented as pre-Ashokan, even pre-Mauryan, but the writing of the plate, especially the configuration of akshara would rather suggest a date after Ashoka. Archaeologist Raymond Allchin believes it to be from Ashoka's period, and considers it to be a precursor of the later copper-plate inscriptions.

The text of the plate has been translated as follows. Its mentions the establishment of two grain depots (Kosthagara) to fight against famine.

This is the oldest Indian copper plate inscription known.

See also

Indian epigraphy

References 

Epigraphy
Prakrit literature
3rd century BC in India
3rd-century BC inscriptions
Copper objects